Ret. Brig. Gen. Felix A. Brawner Jr. was commander of the Scout Rangers of the Armed Forces of the Philippines during the final years of the Marcos dictatorship. Brawner graduate from the Philippine Military Academy in 1957 at the top of his class. He is also known for going to Marawi during the peak of rebellion of the Muslims in Mindanao in the 1970s to initiate good ties with the Muslims. He retired from the military service in 1988.   

He is the brother of former Court of Appeals Presiding Justice and former Comelec Chairman, the late Romeo A. Brawner. His nephew is Lt. Gen. Romeo S Brawner Jr (INF) GSC PA, current Commanding General of the Philippine Army.

References

External links
Scout Ranger cajoles to get his chief out of harm’s way

Filipino generals
Philippine Military Academy alumni
Special forces of the Philippines
Living people
1934 births